James John Benzelock (born June 21, 1947) is a former professional ice hockey right winger.  He was drafted in the first round, fifth overall, by the Minnesota North Stars in the 1968 NHL Amateur Draft. He never played in the National Hockey League; however, he appeared in 166 World Hockey Association games with the Alberta Oilers, Chicago Cougars, and Quebec Nordiques. Benzelock played the majority of his career with teams in the minor professional leagues (CHL, IHL, NAHL).

References

External links

1947 births
Living people
Canadian ice hockey right wingers
Chicago Cougars players
Dayton Gems players
Edmonton Oilers (WHA) players
Ice hockey people from Winnipeg
Iowa Stars (CHL) players
Memphis South Stars players
Minnesota North Stars draft picks
National Hockey League first-round draft picks
Quebec Nordiques (WHA) players
St. James Braves players
Tulsa Oilers (1964–1984) players
Winnipeg Braves players
Winnipeg Jets (WHL) players
Canadian expatriate ice hockey players in the United States